The Dongyong Lighthouse or Tungyung Lighthouse is a lighthouse on the eastern side of Dongyin Island (Tungyung, Dongyong) in Dongyin Township, Lienchiang County, Fujian Province, Taiwan.

History
In the late 19th century, Qing Dynasty opened a port in the area, thus the Dongyong Lighthouse was built by British engineers to guide ships. The construction was completed in 1904. It was designated as third grade national historic site in 1988. That status was later revoked, then restored in 2016.

Geography
The lighthouse faces the Taiwan Strait at the northeast of Dongyin Island.

Architecture
The lighthouse is made of bricks and painted white on the outer walls. The building consists of the main body, the lamp and the roof. On the cliff below the lighthouse are two fog water cannons.

Transportation
The lighthouse is accessible by taxi from Dongyin Island harbor.

See also

 List of lighthouses in Taiwan
 List of tourist attractions in Taiwan

References

External links

 Maritime and Port Bureau MOTC

1902 establishments in China
Dongyin Township
Lighthouses completed in 1902
Lighthouses in Lienchiang County
National monuments of Taiwan